A number of vessels have been named Latona for the Greco-Roman goddess Leto:

 was launched at Newcastle. She served in the Baltic timber trade. A French privateer captured her in 1800, but she was immediately recaptured. She was last listed in 1835. Possibly wrecked in 1835.
 was launched at Whitby. She was wrecked in 1841.

See also
 - one of four vessels by that name that served in the British Royal Navy

Ship names